Mellow Mud is a Latvian 2016 feature film by director Renārs Vimba.

Cast 
  Elīna Vaska as Raja
  Andžejs Lilientāls as Robis
  Edgars Samītis as Oskars
 Ruta Birgere as Grandmother
 Zane Jančevska as Diana

Awards

 Berlin International Film Festival (2016) Crystal Bear Award in the Generation/14plus competition
 Latvian National Film Festival Lielais Kristaps (2016) Best Film
 Elīna Vaska received the IFFI Best Actor Award (Female): Silver Peacock Award at the 47th International Film Festival of India for her performance it the film.

References

External links
 Mellow Mud in the Internet Movie Database

2016 films
Latvian drama films